The Four Sephardic Synagogues are located in the Jewish Quarter of the Old City of Jerusalem. They form a complex of four adjoining synagogues. The first three synagogues were built at different periods to accommodate the religious needs of the Sephardic community, each congregation practising a different rite; later the courtyard was converted into what became known as the "middle synagogue".

Today, most of them are in active use.

History
In 1586, the Ottoman government closed the Ramban Synagogue because it shared a wall with a mosque. As the only other synagogue in Jerusalem at the time belonged to the Karaite minority. Followers of mainstream Rabbinic Judaism, including many descendants of refugees from the 1492 expulsion from Spain, held services in private homes for several years until completing the new Yochanan ben Zakai Synagogue nearby.

In 1835 Muhammad Ali, viceroy of Egypt who ruled Jerusalem at the time, permitted the refurbishment of the synagogues which had been denied since their construction. At the entrance to the Istanbuli Synagogue is a plaque commemorating the restoration.

In 1845, Joseph Schwarz, considered by the Jewish Encyclopedia as "the greatest Jewish authority on Palestinian matters since Estori Farḥi" stated that the buildings were knocked down and completely rebuilt:
All these four Synagogues form, properly speaking, but a very large single building, since they stand near one another, so that one can walk from one into the other, and the centre one, the smallest of all, has no entrance from the street, and you have to reach it through either of the three others. On my arrival, in the year 5593 (1833), I found them in a most miserable and lamentable condition, since they were at the time greatly out of repair, and almost threatened to tumble in, and were useless in rainy weather, inasmuch as they were roofed in with nothing but old and rotten boarding, and our brothers could not obtain the permission from "the pious faithful" to drive as much as a single nail to fasten anything in the building without being first authorized by the most worthy persons in authority… But in the year 5595, Abraim Pacha of Egypt, who understood and was able to instruct and convince his people "that even the Nebbi had grown more tolerant in modern times," gave the permission to rebuild anew from the foundation all these four Synagogues, and they are accordingly at present four fine buildings.

After the fall of the Jewish Quarter during the 1948 Arab–Israeli War the synagogues were damaged by shell fire. During the Jordanian rule, between 1948 and 1967 the buildings of synagogues were used as donkey stables. After the Six-Day War the synagogues were restored by architect Dan Tanai.

Yochanan ben Zakai Synagogue

According to legend, the Yochanan ben Zakai Synagogue, also known as Kahal Kadosh Gadol, is believed to stand on the spot of the Beit Midrash of the tanna Rabban Yochanan ben Zakai, who established the Sanhedrin in Yavneh after the destruction of the Second Temple. The current building was constructed at the beginning of the 17th century, and by 1947, it was the largest synagogue of the Sephardic community in Jerusalem. Since the end of the 19th century, it has served as the site of the Sephardic Chief Rabbi's installation. 

A piece of land below street level was chosen for the synagogue in order to conceal the building from the authorities. Meir Ben Dov, however, is of the opinion that the sub-street level plot wasn't intentionally chosen, but rather that the street level itself was lower at the time and the synagogue had protruded above the street. With time the dwellings surrounding the synagogue were demolished and new houses were built above them, while the synagogue itself was preserved. This cycle continued until today, resulting in the synagogue being situated below street level. It should nevertheless be noted that if construction was indeed permitted, the building itself had to comply with Muslim restrictions for dhimmi houses of prayer not to be higher than mosques. Located in the old Jewish Quarter of Jerusalem, it suffered the same fate as most of the synagogues in the area during the 19 year Jordanian rule after 1948. It has been fully refurbished since Israel gained control of the Old City during the Six-Day War. This work was initiated by Rabbi Meir Yehuda Getz, Rabbi of the Western Wall, who also restored the Yeshivat haMekubalim to its former glory.

Unlike most synagogues, the Yochanan Ben Zakai Synagogue contains two Holy Arks  - one for the Torah scrolls and one for other holy books. Other unique features include the oil jar and Shofar that are kept on a glass shelf by the southern wall's window. Tradition held that these were ancient relicts of the Temple, which could only be used to herald the arrival of the Messiah and in his subsequent anointing ceremony, while a 19th century account by Abraham Moses Luncz implies that the oil jug's importance was connected to the ritual of Shituf Mevo'ot. The original relicts disappeared following the destruction of the synagogue in 1948 and were replaced with the modern iterations seen today.

Istanbuli Synagogue

As the Sephardic community of Jerusalem grew, a large group of immigrants arrived from Istanbul, Turkey, who used the adjacent building as a synagogue from 1764. Over time, the Istanbuli Synagogue, attracted worshipers from the Eastern communities, including Kurdistan and from North and West Africa.

The Hekhal dates from the seventeenth century and was imported from a synagogue which had been destroyed in Ancona, Italy. The Teba, constructed in the eighteenth century, came from a synagogue in Pesaro, Italy. The synagogue was renovated in 1836.

During the 1947–1949 Palestine war the synagogue was occupied by Arabs. After Israel gained control of the Old City during the Six-Day War, it was renovated.

Today, the Istanbuli Synagogue is used by a Spanish and Portuguese congregation following mostly the London rite.

A description of the synagogue was published in 1947 as follows:

Qahal Stāmbūlī(Istanbuli Congregation). This synagogue is immense, but is not distinguished for its beauty. Therein is had a cistern of water and a place of genizah, a repository for worn-out books until such time that they are taken out for burial. In its eastern façade there is an entrance by which they ascend to the street. On Sabbath days in the afternoon, a savant who regularly instructs there expounds [on the Torah] in the colloquial Spanish tongue (Ladino), a lesson that is derived from the weekly biblical lection (parsha) before the multitude of the people, as also [before] the women in the women's court. In all of the synagogues of the Spaniards there are wide benches that are situated only around the [interior] walls and joining the raised platform (dais), and [strewn] over them (i.e. the floor) are mats so as to permit sitting, their legs being beneath their knees, as the manner of the people of the Orient. The precentor stands upon the raised platform (bīmah) and prays while the congregants surround him. In each one of these synagogues there are many Torah scrolls fixed within wooden cases that are fabulously decorated. During the reading, they open the scroll while it stands in an upright position and read in it. There are also crowns and beautiful finials (rīmonīm), and expensive silk curtains that have been embroidered in gold. The women's court in each of these synagogues is located on the inside of the synagogue, [on an upper storey] close to the ceiling, enclosed by a wooden lattice partition, having a separate entrance from the street or from the courtyard.

Eliahu Ha'navi Synagogue

Another synagogue was established in anno 1586 CE and named after Elijah the Prophet. This synagogue is the oldest of the four. The Eliyahu Ha'navi Synagogue mainly served as a beth midrash for Torah study. Also known as Kahal Talmud Torah, it was only used for prayer on festivals. According to legend, the name of the synagogue was given after an event that took place on Yom Kippur, when one person was missing to complete the minyan required for prayer. Out of the blue, a man, unknown to the worshippers, appeared and the service was able to start. The man mysteriously disappeared after the Neilah prayer. The people were sure that the man was none other than Elijah the Prophet.

Emtsai Synagogue

The Emtsai Synagogue or Middle Synagogue, also known as the Kahal Tzion Synagogue, forms the central chamber of the complex. It was originally a courtyard which was probably used as the women's section of the Rabban Yohanan Ben Zakai synagogue. During Sukkot it could be converted into a sukkah for the worshippers. With the growth of the community, it was decided during the middle of the 18th century to roof the yard. It was turned into what is today known as the Middle Synagogue, due to its location in the "middle" of the other three synagogues.

References

External links
 "The Sephardic Council of Jerusalem on the Four Synagogues"
  Batei HaKnesset HaSephardim B'Yerushalayim
  Arba'at Batei HaKnesset HaSephardim B'Rova HaYehudi
 The Spanish & Portuguese Congregation in Israel (Congregation Sha'are Ratzon)

Synagogues in Jerusalem
Sephardi Jewish culture in Jerusalem
Sephardi synagogues
17th-century synagogues
18th-century synagogues